Attila Kovacs (born February 24, 1956) is a former Hungarian footballer who played primarily in Hungary and featured with the Hungary national football team.

Playing career 
Kovacs began his professional career in 1978 with Pécsi Vasutas SK. The following year he signed with Pécsi MFC of the Nemzeti Bajnokság I. In 1979, he signed with Csepel SC, where we would appear in 156 matches. He would spend time with Vasas SC, Kaposvári Rákóczi FC, and would conclude his career with lower leagues clubs like Magyar Kábel, and Konskapoet. In 1998, he would come out of retirement to sign with Mississauga Eagles P.S.C. of the Canadian Professional Soccer League. He made his debut for the club on June 17, 1998 in a match against York Region Shooters.

International career 
Kovacs played for the Hungary national football team from 1983 to 1984, and featured in seven matches. He made his debut for the national team on October 12, 1983 in a UEFA Euro 1984 qualifying match against England.

References 

1956 births
Living people
Hungarian footballers
Hungary international footballers
Pécsi MFC players
Csepel SC footballers
Vasas SC players
Kaposvári Rákóczi FC players
Canadian Soccer League (1998–present) players
Nemzeti Bajnokság I players
Association football goalkeepers
Sportspeople from Pécs